The 1922 DEI Championship season (known as the Gouden Kampioens-Medaille) was the 9th season of the Dutch East Indies Championship football competition since its establishment in 1914. Batavia are the defending champions, having won their 6th league title.

This is the first edition played in league rather than knock-out format. It was contested by 4 teams, and Soerabaja won the championship.

League table

Result
All matches play in Bandoeng.

References

External links
N.I.V.B./N.I.V.U./V.U.V.S.I. Stedenwedstrĳden

1922 in Asian football
1922 in association football
1922 in the Dutch East Indies
Seasons in Indonesian football competitions
Sport in the Dutch East Indies
1922 in Dutch sport